Arroz a la valenciana (Valencian-style rice; in Valencian, arròs a la valenciana) or Valencian rice is a name for a multitude of rice dishes from diverse cuisines of the world, which originate from the rice-cooking tradition of the Valencian Community, in eastern Spain. 

The paella is one of the recipes derived from a generic method to cook rice developed in the old kingdom of Valencia, method also applied to the modern variants of arroz a la valenciana. The method of preparing Valencian rice has been practiced since colonial era and is found in Argentine, Colombian, Cuban, Nicaraguan, Portuguese, Uruguayan and Venezuelan cuisines. It is even found in Filipino cuisine, where it is referred to as arosbalensiyana. On the other hand, Valencian paella, did not emerge until the late 19th century, among the peasants of the Horta of Valencia. In Spain, when a paella has other ingredients that are not "properly Valencian" it receives the informal, popular, and derogatory name of arroz con cosas ('rice with stuff').

Although there is a wide variety of arroz a la valenciana recipes, they all share a few commonalities. For example, typically, the rice is dry (without broth) and colored by various spices (originally saffron). Additionally it is common to include vegetables, meats and seafood.

History 
Although rice was probably grown in Valencia before the Moorish era, it was the Arabs who furthered its cultivation and diversification of use. This is reflected in both the medieval cookbooks of Christians and Muslims, in which it is evident that they were already seasoning their rice with saffron in this era; an example of this is arròs en Cassola al forn by Mestre Robert (16th century).

As time went by, the culture of rice became important in Valencia, with different recipes that added vegetables and meats. In the colonial era, Arroz a la valenciana spread to Spanish colonies in the new world, to countries as far apart as Nicaragua or the Philippines. The recipe has been adapted over time to include new ingredients and to cater to American taste preferences.

The first written mention of Arroz a la valenciana is found in a manuscript from the 18th century: Avisos y instrucciones per lo principiant cuyiner by the Franciscan monk Josep Orri. Shortly afterwards, in 1780 Friar Gerónimo de San Pelayo published a cookbook in Mexico City about Arroz a la valenciana. Additionally, in another Mexican cookbook called New and Simple Art of Cooking (1836) by Antonia Carrillo, there is a Arroz a la valenciana recipe that includes green chiles and saffron. The dish also appears in a cookbook published in La Habana in 1862.

José Castro and Serrano commented that no province knows how to cook rice like Valencia. During a religious event in 1889 in Bergara, Spain, they served the guests Arroz a la valenciana. In his General Dictionary of cooking from 1892, Ángel Muro included a recipe for Arroz a la valenciana to pay homage to the "country of rice". In the 1890s the term arroz a la paella ('in a frying pan') began to be used as synonymous with Arroz a la valenciana. In 1903, the French chef Auguste Escoffier dedicated a few pages to riz valenciennes in his first publication of Le Guide Cullinaire.

Difference between Arroz a la Valenciana and Paella Valenciana 
Both names are frequently used indistinctly to refer to similar preparations of rice,  and, in fact paella could be considered as a specific type of Arroz a la valenciana.

The main difference is that paella only has 10 ingredients, which are Lima beans, tomato, Ferraúra beans, chicken, rabbit, salt, olive oil, round rice, water, and saffron.  These ingredients were endorsed by the Valencian chef Rafael Vidal in 2000 and are acknowledged by the Valencian Government. In contrast, Arroz a la valenciana is instead a "family of recipes" or a general method to cook the dish.

Arroz a la valenciana by country

Bolivian cuisine 
In Bolivia, Arroz a la valenciana is a very popular dish that includes chicken, sometimes chorizo, and a variety of vegetables like peas, onion, tomatoes, green beans (string beans), carrots as well as potatoes from a variety of local imilla. The color of the rice comes from the use of paprika or saffron, and red chilli pepper, which gives the dish some punch.

Chilean cuisine 
 The Chilean style of preparing Arroz a la valenciana differs in its use of curry or turmeric to color the rice; although, occasionally it is prepared with saffron, like in the original Spanish recipe. Sometimes it is called "Chilean paella", and contains primarily an assortment of seafood: clams, shrimp (prawns), Chilean mussels, and clams. Ingredients can be adjusted to the taste profile of each location, and for example one can add sausages or chicken. When using only vegetables, it is referred to as "Arroz a la Jardinera".

Colombian cuisine 
Arroz a la valenciana is a typical coastal dish in Colombia. It usually includes pork or chicken, alongside fish and seafood. And it is mainly seasoned with saffron.

Filipino cuisine 
In the Philippines, Arroz a la valenciana (Tagalog: aros balensiyana) is dubbed “paella of the poor”. It is made with local rice varieties that fall within the class termed malagkít (“sticky”). The vegetables vary from one place to another, although generally it only contains onion and bell pepper. In addition, coconut milk – an indispensable ingredient in the country – may be used in the cooking process.

As in some parts of Latin America, the dish may also have alcohol. Common spirits include white wine or beer, while butter is sometimes used instead of oil. It can also have chicken for its main protein, and at times Bilbao sausage (a Filipino type of sausage) for both nutrition and flavouring.

Cuisine from the Marianas 
The recipe for Arroz a la valenciana made its way to the Mariana Islands, which is located in the Pacific, during the Spanish colonial era. Between the chamorros- its inhabitants- it is known as balensiåna and is seasoned with achiote.

Nicaraguan cuisine 
 The Nicaraguan recipe of Arroz a la Valenciana is different from the Spanish original, since it includes butter instead of oil, onion, tomato sauce, chiltoma (sweet pepper), and other vegetables according to the preferences of the chef. In terms of meat, it usually includes chicken, ham or choricitos. It is one of the typical small plates of rice in Nicaragua. At times it is called "Arroz de piñata", as it is often served during children's birthday celebrations colloquialy called "piñatas". It is usually prepared with beer, along with white wine.

Portuguese cuisine 
 is found throughout all of Portugal, and includes many types of meat (from chicken to pork, or even sausages) and seafood or squid, as well as diverse vegetables like peas (sweet peas), red peppers…etc. The color of rice depends on the use of saffron. Another common spice used in this version of Arroz a la valenciana is garlic. Frequently it includes white wine as well.

Salvadoran cuisine 
In El Salvador, Arroz a la valenciana usually includes hard boiled eggs and several pieces of chicken, like the breast, the gizzard or even the liver. Additionally, a variety of vegetables are added to it, like onion, peas (sweet peas), sweet corn (maize), or carrots. In terms of spice, it is common to use curry or paprika.

See also
 List of chicken dishes
 List of rice dishes

Related dishes
 Arroz junto
 Arroz con pollo
 Arroz negro  
 Bringhe
 Fideuà 
 Jambalaya  
 Paella   
 Paelya     
 Pilaf
 Risotto

Notes

References

Chilean cuisine
Nicaraguan cuisine
Latin American rice dishes
Philippine rice dishes
Chicken and rice dishes